William Scott (17 June 1908 – 6 November 1971) was a Scottish cricketer. He played four first-class matches for Bengal between 1936 and 1938.

See also
 List of Bengal cricketers

References

External links
 

1908 births
1971 deaths
Scottish cricketers
Bengal cricketers